

Boxing

Amateur boxing
 March 8 – 17: 2019 EUBC Under 22 Men & Women European Boxing Championships in  Vladikavkaz
  won both the gold and overall medal tallies.
 April 17 – 28: 2019 Asian Amateur Boxing Championships in  Bangkok
  won the gold medal tally.  won the overall medal tally.
 June 21 – 30: 2019 European Amateur Boxing Championships in  Minsk (in conjunction with the 2019 European Games)
  and  won 2 gold medals each.  won the overall medal tally. 
 September 7 – 21: 2019 AIBA World Boxing Championships in  Yekaterinburg
  and  won 3 gold medals each.  won the overall medal tally.
 September 2 – 11: 2019 EUBC Youth Men & Women European Boxing Championships in  Sofia
  won both the gold and overall medal tallies.
 October 3 – 13: 2019 AIBA Women's World Boxing Championships in  Ulan-Ude
  won both the gold and overall medal tallies.

Professional boxing

World Boxing Super Series tournaments
 October 7, 2018 – October 26, 2019: Super lightweight division Winner:  Josh Taylor
 October 7, 2018 – November 7, 2019: bantamweight division Winner:  Naoya Inoue
 October 13, 2018 – December 14, 2019: cruiserweight division Winner:

Fencing

World fencing events
 April 6 – 14: 2019 World Junior and Cadet Fencing Championships in  Toruń
 Junior Individual Épée winners:  Arthur Philippe (m) /  Federica Isola (f)
 Junior Team Épée winners:  (m) /  (f)
 Junior Individual Foil winners:  Kirill Borodachev (m) /  Lauren Scruggs (f)
 Junior Team Foil winners:  (m) /  (f)
 Junior Individual Sabre winners:  Lorenzo Roma (m) /  Alina Mikhailova (f)
 Junior Team Sabre winners:  (m) /  (f)
 Cadet Individual Épée winners:  Enrico Piatti (m) /  Eszter Muhari (f)
 Cadet Individual Foil winners:  Egor Barannikov (m) /  Lauren Scruggs (f)
 Cadet Individual Sabre winners:  Vasyl Humen (m) /  Luca Szucs (f)
 July 15 – 23: 2019 World Fencing Championships in  Budapest
 Individual Épée winners:  Gergely Siklósi (m) /  Nathalie Moellhausen (f)
 Team Épée winners:  (m) /  (f)
 Individual Foil winners:  Enzo Lefort (m) /  Inna Deriglazova (f)
 Team Foil winners:  (m) /  (f)
 Individual Sabre winners:  Oh Sang-uk (m) /  Olha Kharlan (f)
 Team Sabre winners:  (m) /  (f)

Continental fencing events
 February 20 – 22: 2019 African Junior Fencing Championships in  Algiers
 Junior Individual Épée winners:  Ibrahim Ramadan (m) /  Yousra Zeboudj (f)
 Junior Team Épée winners:  (m) /  (f)
 Junior Individual Foil winners:  Mohamed Hamza (m) /  Noha Hany (f)
 Junior Team Foil winners:  (m) /  (f)
 Junior Individual Sabre winners:  Medhat Moataz (m) /  Mariam M.Ahmed (f)
 Junior Team Sabre winners:  (m) /  (f)
 February 26 – March 3: 2019 Pan American Junior Fencing Championships in  Bogotá
 Junior Individual Épée winners:  Theodore (Ted) Vinnitchouk (m) /  Greta Candreva (f)
 Junior Team Épée winners:  (m) /  (f)
 Junior Individual Foil winners:  Kenji Bravo (m) /  Jessica Zi Jia GUO (f)
 Junior Team Foil winners:  (m) /  (f)
 Junior Individual Sabre winners:  Kamar Skeete (m) /  Natalia Botello (f)
 Junior Team Sabre winners:  (m) /  (f)
 February 27 – March 3: 2019 European Junior Fencing Championships in  Foggia
 Junior Individual Épée winners:  Mate Tamas Koch (m) /  Federica Isola (f)
 Junior Team Épée winners:  (m) /  (f)
 Junior Individual Foil winners:  Tommaso Marini (m) /  Serena Rossini (f)
 Junior Team Foil winners:  (m) /  (f)
 Junior Individual Sabre winners:  Matteo Neri (m) /  Liza Pusztai (f)
 Junior Team Sabre winners:  (m) /  (f)
 March 3 – 8: 2019 Asian Junior Fencing Championships in  Amman
 Junior Individual Épée winners:  JANG Min-hyeok (m) /  SHI Yuexin (f)
 Junior Team Épée winners:  (m) /  (f)
 Junior Individual Foil winners:  Kyota Kawamura (m) /  Amita Berthier (f)
 Junior Team Foil winners:  (m) /  (f)
 Junior Individual Sabre winners:  SUNG Hyeon-mo (m) /  JEON Su-in (f)
 Junior Team Sabre winners:  (m) /  (f)
 June 13 – 18: 2019 Asian Fencing Championships in  Tokyo
 Individual Épée winners:  Masaru Yamada (m) /  ZHU Mingye (f)
 Team Épée winners:  (m) /  (f)
 Individual Foil winners:  Takahiro Shikine (m) /  Jeon Hee-sook (f)
 Team Foil winners:  (m) /  (f)
 Individual Sabre winners:  Oh Sang-uk (m) /  Yoon Ji-su (f)
 Team Sabre winners:  (m) /  (f)
 June 17 – 22: 2019 European Fencing Championships in  Düsseldorf
 Individual Épée winners:  Yuval Freilich (m) /  Coraline Vitalis (f)
 Team Épée winners:  (m) /  (f)
 Individual Foil winners:  Alessio Foconi (m) /  Elisa Di Francisca (f)
 Team Foil winners:  (m) /  (f)
 Individual Sabre winners:  Veniamin Reshetnikov (m) /  Olha Kharlan (f)
 Team Sabre winners:  (m) /  (f)
 June 24 – 28: 2019 African Fencing Championships in  Bamako
 Individual Épée winners:  Houssam Elkord (m) /  Sarra Besbes (f)
 Team Épée winners:  (m) /  (f)
 Individual Foil winners:  Alaaeldin Abouelkassem (m) /  Inès Boubakri (f)
 Team Foil winners:  (m) /  (f)
 Individual Sabre winners:  Mohamed Amer (m) /  Amira Ben Chaabane (f)
 Team Sabre winners:  (m) /  (f)
 June 27 – July 2: 2019 Pan American Fencing Championships in  Toronto
 Individual Épée winners:  Rubén Limardo (m) /  Kelley Hurley (f)
 Team Épée winners:  (m) /  (f)
 Individual Foil winners:  Race Imboden (m) /  Nicole Ross (f)
 Team Foil winners:  (m) /  (f)
 Individual Sabre winners:  Eli Dershwitz (m) /  Anne-Elizabeth Stone (f)
 Team Sabre winners:  (m) /  (f)

2018–19 Fencing Grand Prix
 Épée Grand Prix
 January 25 – 27: Qatari Grand Prix in  Doha
 Winners:  Yannick Borel (m) /  Julia Beljajeva (f)
 March 8 – 10: Hungarian Grand Prix in  Budapest
 Winners:  Kazuyasu Minobe (m) /  Ana Maria Popescu (f)
 May 3 – 5: Colombian Grand Prix (final) in  Cali
 Winners:  Kazuyasu Minobe (m) /  Sun Yiwen (f)
 Foil Grand Prix
 February 8 – 10: Italian Grand Prix in  Turin
 Winners:  Race Imboden (m) /  Alice Volpi (f)
 March 15 – 17: American Grand Prix in  Anaheim
 Winners:  Julien Mertine (m) /  Inna Deriglazova (f)
 May 17 – 19: Chinese Grand Prix (final) in  Shanghai
 Winners:  Alessio Foconi (m) /  Inna Deriglazova (f)
 Sabre Grand Prix
 February 22 – 24: Egyptian Grand Prix in  Cairo
 Winners:  Oh Sang-uk (m) /  Sofya Velikaya (f)
 April 26 – 28: Korean Grand Prix in  Seoul
 Winners:  Oh Sang-uk (m) /  Olha Kharlan (f)
 May 24 – 26: Russian Grand Prix (final) in  Moscow
 Winners:  Boladé Apithy (m) /  Sofya Velikaya (f)

2018–19 Fencing World Cup
 Men's Épée World Cup
 November 23 – 25, 2018: Swiss World Cup in  Bern
 Individual:  Kazuyasu Minobe
 Team: 
 January 11 – 13: German Épée World Cup in  Heidenheim
 Individual:  Alexandre Bardenet
 Team: 
 February 8 – 10: Canadian World Cup in  Vancouver
 Individual:  Koki Kano
 Team: 
 March 22 – 24: Argentinian World Cup in  Buenos Aires
 Individual:  Sergey Bida
 Team: 
 May 17 – 19: French Épée World Cup (final) in  Paris
 Individual:  Park Sang-young
 Team: 
 Women's Épée World Cup
 November 9 – 11, 2018: Estonian World Cup in  Tallinn
 Individual:  Jung Hyo-jung
 Team: 
 January 11 – 13: Cuban World Cup in  Havana
 Individual:  Vivian Kong
 Team: 
 February 8 – 10: Spanish Épée World Cup in  Barcelona
 Individual:  Vivian Kong
 Team: 
 March 22 – 24: Chinese World Cup in  Chengdu
 Individual:  Helene Ngom
 Team: 
 May 17 – 19: Emirati World Cup (final) in  Dubai
 Individual:  Choi In-jeong
 Team: 
 Men's Foil World Cup
 November 9 – 11, 2018: German Men's Foil World Cup in  Bonn
 Individual:  Richard Kruse
 Team: 
 January 11 – 13: French Men's Foil World Cup in  Paris
 Individual:  Alessio Foconi
 Team: 
 January 25 – 27: Japanese World Cup in  Tokyo
 Individual:  Richard Kruse
 Team: 
 March 1 – 3: Egyptian Men's Foil World Cup in  Cairo
 Individual:  Daniele Garozzo
 Team: 
 May 3 – 5: Russian World Cup (final) in  Saint Petersburg
 Individual:  Andrea Cassarà
 Team: 
 Women's Foil World Cup
 November 23 – 25, 2018: Algerian Foil World Cup in  Algiers
 Individual:  Elisa Di Francisca
 Team: 
 January 11 – 13: Polish Foil World Cup in  Katowice
 Individual:  Inna Deriglazova
 Team: 
 January 25 – 27: French Women's Foil World Cup in  Saint-Maur
 Individual:  Inna Deriglazova
 Team: 
 March 1 – 3: Egyptian Women's Foil World Cup in  Cairo
 Individual:  Inna Deriglazova
 Team: 
 May 3 – 5: German Women's Foil World Cup (final) in  Tauberbischofsheim
 Individual:  Inna Deriglazova
 Team: 
 Men's Sabre World Cup
 November 16 – 18, 2018: Algerian Sabre World Cup in  Algiers
 Individual:  HA Han-sol
 Team: 
 February 1 – 3: Polish Sabre World Cup in  Warsaw
 Individual:  Eli Dershwitz
 Team: 
 March 8 – 10: Italian World Cup in  Padoue
 Individual:  Luca Curatoli
 Team: 
 March 22 – 24: Hungarian World Cup in  Budapest
 Individual:  Max Hartung
 Team: 
 May 10 – 12: Spanish Sabre World Cup (final) in  Madrid
 Individual:  Max Hartung
 Team: 
 Women's Sabre World Cup
 November 9 – 11, 2018: French Sabre World Cup in  Orléans
 Individual:  Anna Márton
 Team: 
 January 25 – 27: American World Cup in  Salt Lake City
 Individual:  Cécilia Berder
 Team: 
 March 8 – 10: Greek World Cup in  Athens
 Individual:  Sofia Pozdniakova
 Team: 
 March 22 – 24: Belgian World Cup in  Sint-Niklaas
 Individual:  Manon Brunet
 Team: 
 May 10 – 12: Tunisian World Cup (final) in  Tunis
 Individual:  Sofya Velikaya
 Team:

Judo

World and continental judo events
 April 20 – 23: 2019 Asia-Pacific Judo Championships in  Fujairah
  won the gold medal tally.  won the overall medal tally.
 April 25 – 28: 2019 African Judo Championships in  Cape Town
  and  won 4 gold medals each. Algeria won the overall medal tally.
 April 25 – 28: 2019 Pan American Judo Championships in  Lima
 Individual:  and  won 4 gold medals each. Brazil won the overall medal tally.
 Team Champions: ; Second: ; Third: 
 June 22 – 25: 2019 European Judo Championships in  Minsk (in conjunction with the 2019 European Games)
  won 3 gold medals and 8 overall medals.
 August 25 – September 1: 2019 World Judo Championships in  Tokyo
  won both the gold and overall medal tallies.
 September 25 – 28: 2019 World Cadet Judo Championships in  Almaty
  won both the gold and overall medal tallies.
 October 10 – 13: 2019 World Veterans Judo Championships in  Marrakesh
  won both the gold and overall medal tallies.
 October 16 – 19: 2019 World Junior Judo Championships in  Marrakesh
  won both the gold and overall medal tallies.
 November 1 – 3: 2019 European U23 Judo Championships in  Izhevsk
  won both the gold and overall medal tallies.
 December 14 & 15: 2019 World Judo Masters Championship in  Guangzhou

2019 Judo Grand Slam
 February 9 & 10: JGS #1 in  Paris
  won both the gold and overall medal tallies.
 February 22 – 24: JGS #2 in  Düsseldorf
  won both the gold and overall medal tallies.
 March 15 – 17: JGS #3 in  Yekaterinburg
  won both the gold and overall medal tallies.
 May 10 – 12: JGS #4 in  Baku
  and  won 2 gold medals each.  won the overall medal tally.
 October 6 – 8: JGS #5 in  Brasília
  won both the gold and overall medal tallies.
 October 24 – 26: JGS #6 in  Abu Dhabi
  won both the gold and overall medal tallies.
 November 22 – 24: JGS #7 (final) in  Osaka

2019 Judo Grand Prix
 January 24 – 26: JUGP #1 in  Tel Aviv
  won both the gold and overall medal tallies.
 March 8 – 10: JUGP #2 in  Marrakesh
Germany won the overall medal tally.
 March 29 – 31: JUGP #3 in  Tbilisi
  won the gold medal tally.  won the overall medal tally.
 April 5 – 7: JUGP #4 in  Antalya
 14 national teams won 1 gold medal each.  won the overall medal tally.
 May 24 – 26: JUGP #5 in  Hohhot
  won the gold medal tally.  won the overall medal tally.
 July 5 – 7: JUGP #6 in  Montreal
  won the gold medal tally. Japan and  won 9 overall medals each.
 July 12 – 14: JUGP #7 in  Budapest
  won both the gold and overall medal tallies.
 July 26 – 28: JUGP #8 in  Zagreb
  won both the gold and overall medal tallies.
 September 20 – 22: JUGP #9 (final) in  Tashkent
  won the gold medal tally. Russia and  won 7 overall medals each.

2019 Asian Open
 July 18 & 19: AJO #1 in  Aktau
  won both the gold and overall medal tallies.
 August 3 & 4: AJO #2 in  Taipei
  and  won 6 gold medals each. South Korea won the overall medal tally.
 November 30 & December 1: AJO #3 (final) in

2019 European Open
 February 2 & 3: European Open #1 in  Odivelas (M) &  Sofia (W)
 Men:  and  won 3 gold medals each. France won the overall medal tally.
 Women:  won both the gold and overall medal tallies.
 February 16 & 17: European Open #2 in  Rome (M) &  Oberwart (W)
 Men:  won the gold medal tally.  won the overall medal tally.
 Women:  and  won 2 gold medals each.  and  won 6 overall medals each.
 March 2 & 3: European Open #3 in  Warsaw (M) &  Prague (W)
 Men:  won both the gold and overall medal tallies.
 Women:  won both the gold and overall medal tallies.
 June 1 & 2: European Open #4 in  Cluj-Napoca
  and  won 4 gold medals each. Italy and  won 7 overall medals each.
 September 28 & 29: European Open #5 in  Luxembourg City
  won both the gold and overall medal tallies.
 October 12 & 13: European Open #6 (final) in  Tallinn
  won both the gold and overall medal tallies.

2019 European Cup
 March 9 & 10: European Cup #1 in  Uster-Zürich
  won the gold medal tally.  won the overall medal tally.
 April 13 & 14: European Cup #2 in  Dubrovnik
  and  won 3 gold medals each. Ukraine and the  won 9 overall medals each.
 May 4 & 5: European Cup #3 in  Sarajevo
  and  won 3 gold medals each. Hungary, and  won 6 overall medals each.
 May 18 & 19: European Cup #4 in  Orenburg
  won both the gold and overall medal tallies.
 May 25 & 26: European Cup #5 in  Celje-Podčetrtek
 September 7 & 8: European Cup #6 in  Bratislava
  won the gold medal tally. Germany and  won 9 overall medals each.
 October 19 & 20: European Cup #7 (final) in  Málaga
  won the gold medal tally.  and  won 12 overall medals each.

2019 Pan American Open
 March 9 & 10: PAJO #1 in  Lima
 5 different national teams won 2 gold medals each.  and  won 9 overall medals each.
 March 16 & 17: PAJO #2 in  Córdoba
 4 different national teams won 2 gold medals each.  won the overall medal tally.
 March 23 & 24: PAJO #3 in  Santiago
  won the gold medal tally.  won the overall medal tally.
 June 15 & 16: PAJO #4 in  Quito
  won the gold medal tally.  won the overall medal tally.
 September 7 & 8: PAJO #5 (final) in  Santo Domingo
 The  won both the gold and overall medal tallies.

2019 African Open
 November 9 & 10: AfJO #1 in  Yaoundé
  won both the gold and overall medal tallies.
 November 16 & 17: AfJO #2 (final) in  Dakar

2019 Oceania Open
 November 3 & 4: OJO #1 (only) in  Perth
  won the gold medal tally.  won the overall medal tally.

Karate

International & Continental karate events
 February 8 – 10: 2019 EKF Junior, Cadet & U21 Championships in  Aalborg
  won both the gold and overall medal tallies.
 March 18 – 23: 2019 PKF Championships in  Panama City
 The  won both the gold and overall medal tallies.
 March 28 – 31: 2019 EKF Championships in  Guadalajara
  won the gold medal tally.  won the overall medal tally.
 April 6 & 7: 2019 EKF Mediterranean Championships in  Antalya
  won both the gold and overall medal tallies.
 April 11 & 12: 2019 OKF Championships in  Sydney
  won both the gold and overall medal tallies.
 April 26 – 28: 2019 AKF Junior, Cadet & U21 Championships in  Kota Kinabalu
  won both the gold and overall medal tallies.
 July 9 – 15: 2019 UFAK Junior & Senior Championships in  Gaborone
  and  won 11 gold medals each. Egypt won the overall medal tally.
 July 15 – 21: 2019 AKF Championships in  Tashkent
  won both the gold and overall medal tallies.
 August 26 – September 1: 2019 PKF Junior, Cadet & U21 Championships in  Guayaquil
  won both the gold and overall medal tallies.
 October 23 – 27: 2019 WKF Junior, Cadet & U21 Championships in  Santiago
  won both the gold and overall medal tallies.

2019 Karate 1: Premier League
 January 25 – 27: K1PL #1 in  Paris
  won both the gold and overall medal tallies.
 February 15 – 17: K1PL #2 in  Dubai
  and  won 3 gold medals each.  won the overall medal tally.
 April 19 – 21: K1PL #3 in  Rabat
  and  won 3 gold medals each. Turkey won the overall medal tally.
 June 7 – 9: K1PL #4 in  Shanghai
Japan won the overall medal tally.
 September 6 – 8: K1PL #5 in  Tokyo
  won both the gold and overall medal tallies.
 October 4 – 6: K1PL #6 in  Moscow
  won the gold medal tally.  won the overall medal tally.
 November 29 – December 1: K1PL #7 (final) in  Madrid

2019 Karate 1: Series A
 March 1 – 3: K1SA #1 in  Salzburg
Japan won the overall medal tally.
 May 17 – 19: K1SA #2 in  Istanbul
  won the gold medal tally. Iran and  won 9 overall medals each.
 June 21 – 23: K1SA #3 in  Montreal
  won both the gold and overall medal tallies.
 September 20 – 22: K1SA #4 in  Santiago
  won both the gold and overall medal tallies.

2019 Karate 1: Youth League
 May 3 – 5: K1YL #1 in  Limassol
  won both the gold and overall medal tallies.
 July 5 – 7: K1YL #2 in  Umag
  and  won 4 gold medals each. Japan won the overall medal tally.
 September 27 – 29: K1YL #3 in  Monterrey
  and  won 5 gold medals each.  won the overall medal tally.
 December 13 – 15: K1YL #4 (final) in  Caorle-Venice

Sumo

Taekwondo

International Taekwondo championships
 February 7 – 12: 2019 President's Cup - European Region in  Antalya
 Senior:  and  won 4 gold medals each.  won the overall medal tally.
 Junior:  won both the gold and overall medal tallies.
 Cadet:  won both the gold and overall medal tallies.
 February 26 & 27: 2019 Asian Taekwondo Clubs Championships in  Kish Island
  won all the gold medals and won the overall medal tally, too.
 February 28 – March 3: 2019 European Taekwondo Clubs Championships in  Thessaloniki
 Senior:  won both the gold and overall medal tallies.
 Junior:  won both the gold and overall medal tallies.
 Cadet:  won both the gold and overall medal tallies.
 February 28 – March 3: 2019 President's Cup - Asian Region in  Kish Island
 Senior:  and  won 5 gold medals each. Iran won the overall medal tally.
 Junior:  won both the gold and overall medal tallies.
 March 21 – 24: 2019 WTE Multi European Taekwondo Championships in  Sofia
 Senior:  won both the gold and overall medal tallies.
 Junior:  won both the gold and overall medal tallies.
 Cadet:  won both the gold and overall medal tallies.
 April 6 & 7: 2019 President's Cup - African Region in  Agadir
  won the gold medal tally. Croatia and  won 9 overall medals each.
 April 26 – 28: First Qualification Tournament for Wuxi 2019 WT Grand Slam Champions Series in 
  won both the gold and overall medal tallies.
 May 15 – 19: 2019 World Taekwondo Championships in  Manchester
  won the gold medal tally. South Korea and  won 7 overall medals each.
 June 7 – 9: 2019 World Taekwondo Grand Prix in  Rome
 Men's 58 kg winner:  Jang Jun
 Men's 68 kg winner:  Mirhashem Hosseini
 Men's 80 kg winner:  Maksim Khramtsov
 Men's +80 kg winner:  Vladislav Larin
 Women's 49 kg winner:  Elizaveta Ryadninskaya
 Women's 57 kg winner:  Lee Ah-reum
 Women's 67 kg winner:  Matea Jelić
 Women's +67 kg winner:  Lee Da-bin
 June 14 – 16: 2019 Pan American (Senior, Junior, & Cadet) Taekwondo Championships in  Portland, Oregon
 Senior:  won the gold medal tally. Canada and the  won 17 overall medals each.
 Junior: The  won both the gold and overall medal tallies.
 Cadet: The  won both the gold and overall medal tallies.
 June 27: 2019 President's Cup - Oceania Region in  Gold Coast, Queensland
 Senior:  and  won 3 gold medals each. Chinese Taipei won the overall medal tally.
 Junior:  won both the gold and overall medal tallies.
 Cadet:  won both the gold and overall medal tallies.
 July 7 – 13: Part of the 2019 Summer Universiade in  Naples
 With poomsae:  won both the gold and overall medal tallies.
 Without poomsae:  won the gold medal tally.  won the overall medal tally.
 July 15 – 17: 2019 Kimunyong Cup International Open Taekwondo Championships in  Seoul
  won both the gold and overall medal tallies.
 July 18 – 20: 2019 Oceania Taekwondo Championships & Part of the 2019 Pacific Games in  Apia
 Oceania:  won both the gold and overall medal tallies.
 Pacific Games:  won both the gold and overall medal tallies.
 July 21 – 24: 2019 Asian Junior & Cadet Taekwondo Championships in  Amman
 Junior:  won both the gold and overall medal tallies.
 Cadet:  won both the gold and overall medal tallies.
 July 26 – 28: 2019 El Hassan Taekwondo Cup in  Amman
  won both the gold and overall medal tallies.
 July 27 – 29: Part of the 2019 Pan American Games in  Lima
 Men's 58 kg winner:  Lucas Guzmán
 Men's 68 kg winner:  Edival Pontes
 Men's 80 kg winner:  Miguel Angel Trejos
 Men's +80 kg winner:  Jonathan Healy
 Women's 49 kg winner:  Daniela Souza
 Women's 57 kg winner:  Anastasija Zolotic
 Women's 67 kg winner:  Milena Titoneli
 Women's +67 kg winner:  Briseida Acosta
 August 7 – 10: 2019 World Cadet Taekwondo Championships in  Tashkent
  won both the gold and overall medal tallies.
 August 15 – 18: 2019 Asian Open Taekwondo Championships in  Ho Chi Minh City
 Senior:  and  won 4 gold medals each. Chinese Taipei won the overall medal tally.
 Junior:  won both the gold and overall medal tallies.
 Cadet:  won both the gold and overall medal tallies.
 August 21 – 23: Part of the 2019 African Games in  Rabat
  won the gold medal tally. Morocco and  won 11 overall medals each.
 September 5 – 8: 2019 European U21 Taekwondo Championships in  Helsingborg
  won both the gold and overall medal tallies.
 September 13 – 15: 2019 World Taekwondo Grand Prix in  Chiba
 Men's 58 kg winner:  Jang Jun
 Men's 68 kg winner:  Mirhashem Hosseini
 Men's 80 kg winner:  Milad Beigi
 Men's +80 kg winner:  In Kyo-don
 Women's 49 kg winner:  Panipak Wongpattanakit
 Women's 57 kg winner:  Hatice Kübra İlgün
 Women's 67 kg winner:  Magda Wiet-Henin
 Women's +67 kg winner:  Zheng Shuyin
 October 1 – 3: 2019 European Taekwondo Cadet Championships in  Marina d'Or
  won both the gold and overall medal tallies.
 October 4 – 6: 2019 European Taekwondo Junior Championships in  Marina d'Or
 Senior:  won both the gold and overall medal tallies.
 Junior:  won both the gold and overall medal tallies.
 October 10 – 13: 2019 President's Cup - Pan American Region in  Las Vegas
 Senior:  won the gold medal tally. Mexico and the  won 12 overall medals each.
 Junior: The  won both the gold and overall medal tallies.
 Cadet: The  won both the gold and overall medal tallies.
 October 11 – 13: 2019 World Taekwondo Beach Championships in  Sahl Hasheesh
  won both the gold and overall medal tallies.
 October 18 – 20: 2019 World Taekwondo Grand Prix in  Sofia
 Men's 58 kg winner:  Jang Jun
 Men's 68 kg winner:  Zhao Shuai
 Men's 80 kg winner:  Saleh Al-Sharabaty
 Men's +80 kg winner:  Maicon Andrade
 Women's 49 kg winner:  Wu Jingyu
 Women's 57 kg winner:  Zhou Lijun
 Women's 67 kg winner:  Ruth Gbagbi
 Women's +67 kg winner:  Zheng Shuyin
 October 23 – 26: Part of the 2019 Military World Games in  Wuhan
  and  won 4 gold medals each. China won the overall medal tally.
 November 1 – 3: 2019 Extra European Taekwondo Championships in  Bari
 November 1 – 3: Second Qualification Tournament for Wuxi 2019 WT Grand Slam Champions Series in 
 November 29 & 30: 2019 European Taekwondo Championships (Olympic Weights) in  Dublin
 November 30 & December 1: 2019 European Taekwondo Masters Championships in  Dublin
 November 30 & December 1: 2019 European Taekwondo Championships (Youth Olympic Weights for Clubs) in  Dublin

2019 WTF Open
 February 1 – 3: Cyprus Open in  Larnaca
 Senior:  and the  won 3 gold medals each.  won the overall medal tally.
 Junior:  won the gold medal tally. Greece and  won 21 overall medals each.
 Cadet:  won both the gold and overall medal tallies.
 February 1 – 3: Fujairah Open in the 
  won both the gold and overall medal tallies.
 February 8 – 10: Nigeria Open in  Abuja
  won both the gold and overall medal tallies.
 February 13 – 17: Turkish Open in  Antalya
 Senior:  won the gold medal tally. Uzbekistan and  won 8 overall medals each.
 Junior:  won both the gold and overall medal tallies.
 Cadet:  won both the gold and overall medal tallies.
 February 21 – 24: Egypt Open in  Hurghada
 Senior:  won both the gold and overall medal tallies.
 Cadet:  won both the gold and overall medal tallies.
 February 23 & 24: Slovenia Open in  Ljubljana
  won both the gold and overall medal tallies.
 February 28 – March 3: United States Open in  Las Vegas
 Senior:  won the gold medal tally. The  won the overall medal tally.
 Junior: The  won both the gold and overall medal tallies.
 Cadet: The  won both the gold and overall medal tallies.
 March 4 & 5: Fajr Open in  Kish Island
  won both the gold and overall medal tallies.
 March 9 & 10: Dutch Open in  Eindhoven
 Senior:  and  won 3 gold medals each.  won the overall medal tally.
 Junior:  won the gold medal tally.  won the overall medal tally.
 Cadet:  won both the gold and overall medal tallies.
 March 9 & 10: Dominican Republic Open in  Santo Domingo
  won both the gold and overall medal tallies.
 March 16 & 17: Belgian Open in  Lommel
 Senior:  won both the gold and overall medal tallies.
 Junior:  won the gold medal tally.  won the overall medal tally.
 Cadet:  won both the gold and overall medal tallies.
 March 30 & 31: German Open in  Hamburg
  won the gold medal tally. China and  won 12 overall medals each.
 April 5 – 7: Puerto Rico Open in  San Juan
  won the gold medal tally. Mexico and  won 14 overall medals each.
 April 11 – 14: Mexico Open in  Mexico City
  won both the gold and overall medal tallies.
 April 12 – 14: Ukraine Open in  Kharkiv
 Senior:  won the gold medal tally.  won the overall medal tally.
 Junior:  won both the gold and overall medal tallies.
 Cadet:  won both the gold and overall medal tallies.
 April 14: Spanish Open in  Castellón de la Plana
  won the gold medal tally.  won the overall medal tally.
 April 20 & 21: Sofia Open in 
 Senior:  won both the gold and overall medal tallies.
 Junior:  won the gold medal tally.  won the overall medal tally.
 Cadet:  and  won 4 gold medals each. Serbia and  won 13 overall medals each.
 June 8 & 9: Austrian Open in  Innsbruck
 Senior:  won the gold medal tally.  won the overall medal tally.
 Junior:  won both the gold and overall medal tallies.
 Cadet:  won both the gold and overall medal tallies.
 June 11 – 16: India Open in  Hyderabad
  won both the gold and overall medal tallies.
 June 15 & 16: Luxembourg Open in  Luxembourg City
 Senior:  and  won 3 gold medals each. Spain won the overall medal tally.
 Junior:  won the gold medal tally.  won the overall medal tally.
 Cadet:  won both the gold and overall medal tallies.
 June 28 & 29: Australian Open in  Gold Coast, Queensland
 Senior:  won the gold medal tally.  won the overall medal tally.
 Junior:  won both the gold and overall medal tallies.
 Cadet:  won both the gold and overall medal tallies.
 July 5 – 10: Korea Open in  Chuncheon
  won both the gold and overall medal tallies.
 August 29 – September 1: Costa Rica Open in  San José
  won both the gold and overall medal tallies.
 September 6 – 8: Beirut Open in 
 Senior:  won the gold medal tally.  won the overall medal tally.
 Junior:  won both the gold and overall medal tallies.
 Cadet:  won both the gold and overall medal tallies.
 September 12 – 15: Chile Open in  Viña del Mar
  won both the gold and overall medal tallies.
 September 20 – 22: Albanian Open in  Tirana
  won the gold medal tally.  won the overall medal tally.
 September 21 & 22: Polish Open in  Warsaw
 Senior:  won the gold medal tally.  won the overall medal tally.
 Junior:  won both the gold and overall medal tallies.
Poland won the overall medal tally.
 September 28 & 29: Russia Open in  Moscow
  won both the gold and overall medal tallies.
 October 4 – 6: Canada Open in  Montreal
 Senior:  won both the gold and overall medal tallies.
 Junior: The  won the gold medal tally. The United States and  won 32 overall medals each.
 Cadet: The  won both the gold and overall medal tallies.
 October 5 & 6: Riga Open in 
 Senior:  won the gold medal tally.  won the overall medal tally.
 Junior:  won both the gold and overall medal tallies.
 Cadet:  won both the gold and overall medal tallies.
 October 11 – 13: Bosnia and Herzegovina Open in  Zenica
  won both the gold and overall medal tallies.
 October 18 – 20: Greece Open in  Chalcis (Chalkida)
 Senior:  won both the gold and overall medal tallies.
 Junior:  won both the gold and overall medal tallies.
 Cadet:  won both the gold and overall medal tallies.
 October 26 & 27: Serbia Open in  Belgrade
 Senior:  won the gold medal tally.  won the overall medal tally.
 Junior: 
 Cadet: 
 November 1 – 3: Palestine Open in  Nablus
  and  won 6 gold medals each. Jordan won the overall medal tally.
 November 7 – 9: China Open in  Xi'an
 November 9 & 10: Croatia Open in  Zagreb
 November 16 & 17: Dracula Open in  Iași
 November 16 & 17: French Open in  Paris
 November 23 & 24: Israel Open in  Ramla

Wrestling

World wrestling championships
 July 29 – August 4: 2019 World Cadet Wrestling Championships in  Sofia
 Cadet Men's Freestyle:  won the gold medal tally. Russia and  won 7 overall medals each.
 Cadet Women's Freestyle:  won both the gold and overall medal tallies.
 Cadet Greco-Roman:  won the gold medal tally.  won the overall medal tally.
 August 11: 2019 World Junior & Cadet Beach Wrestling Championships in  Odessa

 Junior Men's 60 kg:  Furkan Cay
 Junior Men's 70 kg:  Maksym Lavrov
 Junior Men's 80 kg:  Buluthan Oksuz
 Junior Men's +80 kg:  Roman Dovhaliuk
 Cadet Men's 60 kg:  Ahmet Gizir
 Cadet Men's 70 kg:  Andrii Zheliev
 Cadet Men's +70 kg:  Angelos Kouklaris

 Junior Women's 50 kg:  Kateryna Chalenko
 Junior Women's 60 kg:  Zeynep Yildirim
 Junior Women's +60 kg:  Cathrine Frilseth
 Cadet Women's 50 kg:  Maral Tangirbergenova
 Cadet Women's +50 kg:  Amit Elor

 August 12 – 18: 2019 World Junior Wrestling Championships in  Tallinn
Russia won the overall medal tally.
 Junior Women's Freestyle:  won both the gold and overall medal tallies.
 Junior Greco-Roman:  won both the gold and overall medal tallies.
 September 14 – 22: 2019 World Wrestling Championships in  Nur-Sultan
 Men's Freestyle:  won both the gold and overall medal tallies.
 Women's Freestyle: The  won the gold medal tally.  won the overall medal tally.
Russia won the overall medal tally.
 October 28 – November 3: 2019 World U23 Wrestling Championships in  Budapest
 U23 Men's Freestyle:  won the gold medal tally.  won the overall medal tally.
 U23 Women's Freestyle:  won both the gold and overall medal tallies.
 U23 Greco-Roman:  won both the gold and overall medal tallies.

Wrestling World Cup
 March 16 & 17: 2019 Men's Freestyle World Cup in  Yakutsk
 Champions: ; Second: ; Third: 
 November 16 & 17: 2019 Women's Freestyle World Cup in  Narita
 November 30 & December 1: 2019 Men's Greco-Roman World Cup in  Tehran
 December 5 & 6: 2019 World Wrestling Clubs Cup (Greco-Roman) in  Tehran
 December 19 & 20: 2019 World Wrestling Clubs Cup (Men's Freestyle) in  Tehran

Wrestling Grand Prix
 January 24 – 27: 2019 Grand Prix Ivan Yariguin in  Krasnoyarsk
 Men's Freestyle:  won all the gold medals and won the overall medal tally, too.
 Women's Freestyle:  and  won 3 gold medals each. Russia won the overall medal tally.
 February 1 – 3: 2019 Grand Prix de France Henri Deglane in  Nice
 Men's Freestyle:  won both the gold and overall medal tallies.
 Women's Freestyle:  and  won 2 gold medals each. Kyrgyzstan won the overall medal tally.
 Greco-Roman:  won both the gold and overall medal tallies.
 February 9 & 10: 2019 Grand Prix Zagreb Open in 
 Greco-Roman:  and  won 2 gold medals each.  won the overall medal tally.
 February 22 – 24: 2019 Grand Prix of Germany (Women's Freestyle) in  Dormagen
 Women's Freestyle: The  and  won 3 gold medals each. The United States won the overall medal tally.
 February 23 & 24: 2019 Hungarian Grand Prix (Polyák Imre Memorial) in  Győr
 Greco-Roman:  and  won 2 gold medals each.  and  won 4 overall medals each.
 July 5 – 7: 2019 Grand Prix of Spain in  Madrid
 Men's Freestyle:  and the  won 2 gold medals each. Germany won the overall medal tally.
 Women's Freestyle:  won both the gold and overall medal tallies.
 Greco-Roman:  and  won 4 gold medals each. Russia won the overall medal tally.
 August 3 & 4: 2019 Grand Prix of Germany (Greco-Roman) in  Dortmund
 Greco-Roman:  won both the gold and overall medal tallies.
 August 7 – 11: 2019 Tbilisi Grand Prix of V. Balavadze and G. Kartozia in 
 Men's Freestyle:  won both the gold and overall medal tallies.
 Greco-Roman:  won both the gold and overall medal tallies.

Continental and regional wrestling championships
 March 4 – 10: 2019 U23 Senior European Wrestling Championships in  Novi Sad
 Men's U23 Freestyle:  won both the gold and overall medal tallies.
 Women's U23 Freestyle:  won both the gold and overall medal tallies.
 U23 Greco-Roman:  won the gold medal tally.  and  won 8 overall medals each.
 March 21 – 24: 2019 U23 Senior Asian Championships in  Ulaanbaatar
 Men's U23 Freestyle:  won both the gold and overall medal tallies.
 Women's U23 Freestyle:  and  won 4 gold medals each. Mongolia won the overall medal tally.
 U23 Greco-Roman:  and  won 4 gold medals each. Iran won the overall medal tally.
 March 26 – 31: 2019 African Wrestling Championships (Senior, Junior, & Cadet) in  Hammamet
 Men's Freestyle:  and  won 3 gold medals each. Egypt won the overall medal tally.
 Women's Freestyle:  won the gold medal tally. Nigeria and  won 9 overall medals each.
 Greco-Roman:  won both the gold and overall medal tallies.
Algeria and Egypt won 7 overall medals each.
 Women's Junior Freestyle:  won both the gold and overall medal tallies.
 Junior Greco-Roman:  won the gold medal tally. Egypt and  won 9 overall medals each.
 Men's Cadet Freestyle:  and  won 3 gold medals each. Tunisia won the overall medal tally.
 Women's Cadet Freestyle:  won both the gold and overall medal tallies.
 Cadet Greco-Roman:  won both the gold and overall medal tallies. 
 April 8 – 14: 2019 European Wrestling Championships in  Bucharest
 Men's Freestyle:  and  won 3 gold medals each.  won the overall medal tally.
 Women's Freestyle:  won both the gold and overall medal tallies.
 Greco-Roman:  won both the gold and overall medal tallies.
 April 18 – 21: 2019 Pan American Wrestling Championships in  Buenos Aires
 Men's Freestyle:  won all the gold medals and won the overall medal tally, too.
 Women's Freestyle:  won both the gold and overall medal tallies.
 Greco-Roman:  and  won 4 gold medals each. The United States won the overall medal tally.
 April 20 & 21: 2019 Oceania Wrestling Championships (Senior, Junior, & Cadet) in  Yona
 Note: There was no junior & cadet women's freestyle events here.
 Men's Freestyle:  won the gold medal tally.  won the overall medal tally.
 Women's Freestyle:  and  won 2 gold medals each. New Zealand won the overall medal tally.
 Greco-Roman:  won the gold medal tally. Palau and the  3 overall medals each.
 Men's Junior Freestyle:  won the gold medal tally. Australia and the  won 4 overall medals each.
 Junior Greco-Roman: The  won both the gold and overall medal tallies.
 Men's Cadet Freestyle:  won the gold medal tally.  won the overall medal tally.
 Cadet Greco-Roman:  won by default.
 April 23 – 28: 2019 Asian Wrestling Championships in  Xi'an
 Men's Freestyle:  won both the gold and overall medal tallies.
 Women's Freestyle:  and  won 4 gold medals each. Japan won the overall medal tally.
 Greco-Roman:  won the gold medal tally. Iran and  won 7 overall medals each.
 May 2 – 5: 2019 Mediterranean Cadet & U23 Wrestling Championships in  Tunis
 Cadet Men's Freestyle:  won both the gold and overall medal tallies.
 Cadet Women's Freestyle:  won both the gold and overall medal tallies.
 Cadet Greco-Roman:  won the gold medal tally.  won the overall medal tally.
 U23 Men's Freestyle:  won both the gold and overall medal tallies.
 U23 Women's Freestyle:  won both the gold and overall medal tallies.
 U23 Greco-Roman:  won the gold medal tally.  won the overall medal tally.
 May 4: 2019 Nordic Junior & Cadet Wrestling Championships in  Daugavpils
 Note: There was no junior men's and women's freestyle events here.
 Junior Greco-Roman:  won both the gold and overall medal tallies.
 Cadet Men's Freestyle:  won both the gold and overall medal tallies.
 Cadet Women's Freestyle:  won the gold medal tally.  won the overall medal tally.
 Cadet Greco-Roman:  won the gold medal tally.  and  won 6 overall medals each.
 May 11: 2019 Nordic (Senior) Wrestling Championships in  Kristiansund
 Women's Freestyle:  and  both won 2 gold medals and 4 overall medals each.
 Greco-Roman:  and  won 3 gold medals each. Norway won the overall medal tally.
 June 3 – 9: 2019 European Junior Wrestling Championships in  Pontevedra
 Junior Men's Freestyle:  won both the gold and overall medal tallies.
 Junior Women's Freestyle:  won the gold medal tally.  won the overall medal tally.
 Junior Greco-Roman:  and  won 3 gold medals each.  won the overall medal tally.
 June 5 – 7: 2019 Pan American Junior Wrestling Championships in  Guatemala City
 Junior Men's Freestyle: The  won both the gold and overall medal tallies.
 Junior Women's Freestyle: The  won both the gold and overall medal tallies.
 Junior Greco-Roman:  won the gold medal tally. The  won the overall medal tally.
 June 17 – 23: 2019 European Cadet Wrestling Championships in  Faenza
 Cadet Men's Freestyle:  won both the gold and overall medal tallies.
 Cadet Women's Freestyle:  won both the gold and overall medal tallies.
 Cadet Greco-Roman:  and  won 3 gold medals each. Russia won the overall medal tally.
 June 27 – 30: 2019 European U15 Wrestling Championships in  Kraków
 U15 Men's Freestyle:  won both the gold and overall medal tallies.
 U15 Women's Freestyle:  won the gold medal tally.  won the overall medal tally.
 U15 Greco-Roman:  won both the gold and overall medal tallies.
 June 28 – 30: 2019 Pan American Cadet Wrestling Championships in  Morelia
 Cadet Men's Freestyle: The  won both the gold and overall medal tallies.
 Cadet Women's Freestyle: The  won both the gold and overall medal tallies.
 Cadet Greco-Roman: The  won the gold medal tally.  won the overall medal tally.
 July 4 – 7: 2019 Asian Cadet Wrestling Championships in  Nur-Sultan
 Cadet Men's Freestyle:  won both the gold and overall medal tallies.
 Cadet Women's Freestyle:  won the gold medal tally.  won the overall medal tally.
 Cadet Greco-Roman:  won the gold medal tally. Iran, &  won 7 overall medals each.
 July 9 – 14: 2019 Asian Junior Wrestling Championships in  Chonburi
 Junior Men's Freestyle:  won both the gold and overall medal tallies.
 Junior Women's Freestyle:  won both the gold and overall medal tallies.
 Junior Greco-Roman:  won both the gold and overall medal tallies.
 October 16 – 22: 2019 Arab Junior & Cadet Wrestling Championships in  Sulaymaniyah
 November 19 – 23: 2019 South American Wrestling Championships (Senior, Junior, & Cadet) in  Santiago
 November 25 & 26: 2019 Arab Wrestling Championships in  Cairo

Wushu
 October 20 – 23: 2019 World Wushu Championships in  Shanghai
  won both the gold and overall medal tallies.

References

External links
 International Boxing Association (Amateur)
 FIE - Fédération Internationale d'Escrime (International Fencing Federation)
 International Judo Federation
 World Karate Federation
 World Association of Kickboxing Organizations
 International Mixed Martial Arts Federation
 International Federation of Muaythai Amateur
 International Sambo Federation
 International Sumo Federation
 World Taekwondo Federation
 United World Wrestling
 International Wushu Federation

Combat sports
combat
2019 sport-related lists